Main Street Banks was a bank based in Atlanta, Georgia. In 2006, it was acquired by BB&T. The bank operated 24 branches.

History
The bank was founded in 1901 as The Bank of Covington. 

In 1996, the bank was renamed Main Street Banks.

In December 2002, the company acquired First National Bank of Johns Creek for $26.2 million.

In May 2003, the company acquired First Colony Bancshares Inc. for $96 million.

In June 2004, the bank laid off 37 employees.

In June 2006, the bank was acquired by BB&T for $599 million in stock.

References

Banks established in 1901
Banks disestablished in 2006
Defunct banks of the United States